The Men's foil event of the 2011 World Fencing Championships took place on October 13, 2011.

Medalists

Draw

Finals

Top half

Section 1

Section 2

Bottom half

Section 3

Section 4

External links
 Bracket

2011 World Fencing Championships